The singles discography of American country singer-songwriter Bill Anderson contains 84 singles, three promotional singles, 6 other charted songs and four music videos. After signing to Decca Records in 1958, Anderson released a series of early singles that became hits, reaching the top ten and 20. This included "That's What It's Like to Be Lonesome" (1958), "The Tip of My Fingers" (1960) and "Po' Folks" (1961). The following year, he reached number one on the Billboard Country and Western Sides chart with "Mama Sang a Song." In 1963, Anderson released his most commercially successful single, "Still." The song was his second number one country single and his first (and only) top ten hit on the Billboard Hot 100, climbing to number eight. His follow-up single, "8×10" reached similar crossover success. Anderson released 11 more top ten country hits during the rest of the decade. This included the number one singles "I Get the Fever" (1966) and "My Life (Throw It Away If I Want To)" (1969). He also had a number one hit with Jan Howard called "For Loving You" in 1968. Anderson also had top ten hits with "I Love You Drops" (1965), "Happy State of Mind" (1968) and a cover of "But You Know I Love You" (1969).

Anderson would have 16 additional top ten country hits during the 1970s. In the early decade he had hits with "Love Is a Sometimes Thing," "Quits" and "If You Can Live with It (I Can Live Without It)." His 1973 single "World of Make Believe" reached number one on the Billboard country chart. He collaborated with Mary Lou Turner in 1976 on the single "Sometimes," which became his final number one hit. Anderson's style shifted towards a Countrypolitan direction in the late 1970s, but he continued having major hits. This included "I Can't Wait Any Longer" (1978), which was his final top ten hit, reaching number four. Anderson's final top 20 hit was "This Is a Love Song" in 1979. Before leaving Decca (now MCA Records), he released his final top 40 single, "Make Mine Night Time." Anderson recorded sporadically during the 1980s for independent labels, but continued to have charting singles. Among these tunes was "When You Leave That Way You Can Never Go Back" in 1985. His 1991 release, "Deck of Cards," was also his final charting single, reaching number 60 on the country songs chart.

Singles

As lead artist

As a collaborative artist

As a featured artist

Promotional singles

Other charted songs

Music videos

Notes

References

External links
 Bill Anderson discography at Discogs

Bill Anderson (singer) songs
Country music discographies
Discographies of American artists